The Rugby League Conference Yorkshire Premier is a division in the Rugby League Conference for teams in the Yorkshire area.

It was first contested in 2008 following the break-up of the previous North Premier into the North West and Yorkshire Premiers.

History

The Rugby League Conference was born in 1997 as the Southern Conference, a 10-team pilot league for teams in the South of England and English Midlands. Rotherham Giants became the first Yorkshire-based team to join when they entered the Northern division in 2000. Other teams followed playing in the North East and North Midlands divisions until a Yorkshire division was created in 2004.

The Premier Division were set up in 2005 for teams who had achieved a certain playing standard and were able to travel further afield to find stronger opposition. The new Premier Divisions included the North Premier, the South Premier, the Central Premier and the Welsh Premier. The Central Premier had two Midlands clubs and the rest of the clubs were from Yorkshire or Lancashire whilst the North Premier had clubs from the North East of England and Cumbria. The Premier divisions saw a change in boundaries in 2006 leaving the North Premier division covering a larger area to give the Midlands clubs their own premier division.

The Yorkshire Premier came into existence in 2008 when the North Premier was broken up into the North West and Yorkshire Premiers.

Rugby League Conference Pyramid

 RLC National
 RLC Yorkshire East & RLC Yorkshire West
 Yorkshire & Humber Merit League

Above the RLC Yorkshire East and RLC Yorkshire West is the National Division and below is the Yorkshire & Humber Merit League.

Other Premier divisions are the South, Welsh, Midlands and North West.

2010 structure

Teams play each other on a home-and-away basis. Each Premier division then has its own play-off series to determine the champion with the five divisional winners entering the national play-offs. The winner of the Yorkshire Premier first plays-off against the winner of the North West Premier to determine the overall RLC champion of the North of England. The winner of the national play-offs is awarded the Harry Jepson Trophy.

2011 structure

Instead of having a Yorkshire Premier and a Yorkshire regional league, the teams are split geographically into an East and West League. Each league has 8 teams giving a 14-game league season leading to play-offs.

For the play-offs the top 2 teams in the West will play off against the top two teams from the East (West 1 v East 2, East 1 v West 2) for a place in the Premier Grand final - the grand final winner will progress to the national Premier play-offs. Teams 3 and 4 from each division will play off (West 3 v East 4, East 3 v West 4 for a place in the Regional Grand final - the grand final winner will progress to the national regional play-offs.

East
Barnsley Broncos
Cutsyke Raiders
Knottingley Stozle Rockware
Moorends-Thorne Marauders
Rotherham Giants
Scarborough Pirates
Walton Warriors
York Lokomotive

West 
Doncaster Toll Bar
East Leeds ARLFC
Guisley Rangers
Leeds Akkies
Lindley Swifts
Parkside Hawks
Prospect Pirates
Shaw Cross Sharks

League standings

 1 competed as East Riding Rangers in 2009

Key

Titles

Predecessor competitions

2005 North Premier: West Cumbria Crusaders
2005 Central Premier: Leeds Akkies
2006 North Premier: East Lancashire Lions
2007 North Premier: Carlisle Centurions
2008 North Premier: Carlisle Centurions

Yorkshire Premier
2009 Kippax Knights
2010 East Leeds

External links
 Official website
 Unofficial RLC website

Rugby League Conference
Rugby league competitions in Yorkshire